Lochearn is an unincorporated community and census-designated place in Baltimore County, Maryland, United States, located immediately to the west of the City of Baltimore. Per the 2020 census, the population was 25,511.

Geography
Lochearn is bordered on the east by the Baltimore City line, on the south by Gwynn Oak Avenue, Woodlawn Drive, and Dogwood Road, on the west by the Baltimore Beltway, and on the northeast by the Baltimore Metro transit line, including the Milford Mill station. Woodmoor shopping center is located on Essex and Liberty roads.

Lochearn is located at  (39.350630, −76.729755).

Major surface thoroughfares serving Lochearn
 Essex Road
 Liberty Road (Maryland Route 26) to Liberty Heights Avenue starting after Kelox Road and Northern Parkway in Baltimore City.
 Milford Mill Road
 Patterson Avenue (Baltimore) starting in Baltimore County in Lochearn to the Baltimore City line at Alter Street to Wabash Avenue, then Reisterstown Road. (Reisterstown Plaza is on the left hand side.)

Neighborhoods within Lochearn
 Brighton (part of Brighton is in Baltimore City)
 Milford
 Villa Nova
 Campfield Gardens
 Lochearn
 Forest Gardens
 Sudbrook Park
 Willow Glen
 Williamsburg/ Park Hill

Climate
The climate in this area is characterized by hot, humid summers and generally mild to cool winters.  According to the Köppen Climate Classification system, Lochearn has a humid subtropical climate, abbreviated "Cfa" on climate maps.

Transportation

Roads
The main road that runs through Lochearn is Liberty Road. Smaller roads serving individual communities include Buckingham Road, Croydon Road, Elba Drive, Essex Road, Lugine Avenue, Patterson Avenue, and St. Lukes Lane.

Public transportation
The Maryland Transit Administration's CityLink Lime Bus runs along Liberty Road through Lochearn.

Demographics

2020 census

Note: the US Census treats Hispanic/Latino as an ethnic category. This table excludes Latinos from the racial categories and assigns them to a separate category. Hispanics/Latinos can be of any race.

2000 Census
At the 2000 census there were 25,269 people, 9,771 households, and 6,732 families in the CDP. The racial makeup of the CDP was 18.50% White, 78.40% African American, 0.30% Native American, 0.81% Asian, 0.04% Pacific Islander, 0.49% from other races, and 1.46% from two or more races. Hispanic or Latino of any race were 1.50%. 5% of Lochearn's residents were German, 4% Irish, 3% West Indian, 2% Sub-Saharan African, 2% English, 2% Jamaican, and 2% African.

Of the 9,771 households 29.6% had children under the age of 18 living with them, 42.9% were married couples living together, 21.1% had a female householder with no husband present, and 31.1% were non-families. 26.4% of households were one person and 8.1% were one person aged 65 or older. The average household size was 2.55 and the average family size was 3.06.

The age distribution was 25.1% under the age of 18, 7.8% from 18 to 24, 27.2% from 25 to 44, 26.1% from 45 to 64, and 13.7% 65 or older. The median age was 38 years. For every 100 females, there were 84.4 males. For every 100 females age 18 and over, there were 78.9 males.

The median household income was $49,517 and the median family income  was $54,994. Males had a median income of $35,459 versus $30,339 for females. The per capita income for the CDP was $21,652. About 4.7% of families and 7.0% of the population were below the poverty line, including 9.3% of those under age 18 and 7.3% of those age 65 or over.

Notable native
Kevin B. Kamenetz, 11th County Executive of Baltimore County (2010-2018) and County Councilman (1994-2010).

References

 
Census-designated places in Baltimore County, Maryland
Census-designated places in Maryland